Siripala Gamalath (born July 18, 1952) is a Sri Lankan politician and a member of the Parliament of Sri Lanka. He is a member of the United People's Freedom Alliance party and of Buddhist religion.

References
 

Living people
1952 births
Sinhalese businesspeople
Members of the 13th Parliament of Sri Lanka
Members of the 14th Parliament of Sri Lanka
Members of the 15th Parliament of Sri Lanka
Members of the 16th Parliament of Sri Lanka
Government ministers of Sri Lanka
Sri Lanka Freedom Party politicians
United People's Freedom Alliance politicians